The Holy Eucharist: Rite Two is an alternative service book authorised in 1993 by the 41st Diocesan Synod of the Diocese of Hong Kong and Macau, known as the General Synod of Hong Kong Sheng Kung Hui after its establishment in 1998. It is used as an alternative to the Book of Common Prayer published by the former Chung Hua Sheng Kung Hui.

References

External links
Hong Kong Sheng Kung Hui

Hong Kong Sheng Kung Hui
Anglican liturgical books